"Cake by the Ocean" is the debut single by American band DNCE. It was released through Republic Records, as the lead single from their debut EP, Swaay, on September 18, 2015. It is also included on their debut studio album, DNCE (2016). "Cake by the Ocean" is a 1970s-inspired pop, R&B, dance, and disco-funk song.

The song reached the top 10 on multiple national record charts including those of Australia, Canada, Germany, the United Kingdom, and the United States. It also topped the U.S. Billboard Adult Pop Songs airplay chart and has been certified Gold or higher by a number of recording industry associations. Billboard ranked "Cake by the Ocean" at number 44 on their "100 Best Pop Songs of 2016" list. Nielsen Music named "Cake by the Ocean" the second most-played song in Canada for 2016, behind only Justin Bieber's 2015 single, "Love Yourself".

Composition
"Cake by the Ocean" was co-written by Joe Jonas, Justin Tranter, and Swedish duo Mattman & Robin, who also produced the song. Lyrically, the song is about sexual intercourse, but is also often interpreted to be referring to the cocktail Sex on the Beach. The song's title originated from Mattman & Robin's repeatedly confusing the phrase "sex on the beach" for "cake by the ocean".

Chart performance

"Cake by the Ocean" debuted at number 79 on the US Billboard Hot 100 issued for November 7, 2015. On March 5, 2016, the song moved from number 11 to number 10 and became Jonas' fourth career top-10 entry, making him the sixth artist to reach the top 10 as a soloist and with two groups. It peaked at number nine in its 19th week on the chart and spent 46 weeks in total. The Recording Industry Association of America (RIAA) certified the single 5× Platinum, which denotes five million units based on sales and track-equivalent on-demand streams. On the Canadian Hot 100, "Cake by the Ocean" peaked at number seven and was certified 2× Platinum by Music Canada.

The song reached number four in the United Kingdom and the British Phonographic Industry (BPI) certified it 3× Platinum. In Italy, it peaked at number 11 and was certified 4× Platinum. "Cake by the Ocean" reached number six in Australia and was certified 7× Platinum. In New Zealand, the song peaked at number 10 and was certified 2× Platinum. "Cake by the Ocean" charted within the top five of national record charts, at number one in Argentina, Ecuador, Israel, number two in Slovenia, number five in Austria, the Czech Republic, Serbia. It received a 2× Platinum certification Poland, Spain, and Platinum in France, Germany, the Netherlands, Sweden.

Music video
The video, directed by Black Coffee and Jonas' then-girlfriend Gigi Hadid, was released on October 16, 2015. It depicts DNCE performing "in front of a giant piece of cake on the beach" when a cake-throwing battle ensues between The Fat Jew and "a bunch of bikini clad women who are 'Team DNCE'". Both vie "to become the 'cake fight champion', but as it turns out, everyone is a winner, as the scene becomes one giant beach party". The music video currently sits at 466 million views on YouTube. It also features product placement scenes by the dating app Bumble including a shot of a hand swiping through photos of women and a Bumble-branded towel being waved.

Performances  
DNCE have performed the song as musical guests on The Ellen DeGeneres Show and The Graham Norton Show. The band performed the song live at the 2016 Radio Disney Music Awards, the 2016 Kids' Choice Awards, and the 2016 Billboard Music Awards in the US, and the 2016 Royal Variety Performance in the UK.

DNCE performed a 1950s rock-inspired version of "Cake by the Ocean" for their cameo in Grease: Live as Johnny Casino and the Gamblers.

The Jonas Brothers, which is Joe's group at the time, performed the song as part of 
the medley of hits along with Nick's debut hit Jealous and the recently-released, Sucker at the 2019 Billboard Music Awards.

Usage in media
The song is featured in the films Pitch Perfect 3, Bad Moms, Middle School: The Worst Years of My Life, Malibu Rescue, The King of Staten Island, Sing 2, and in trailers for Mike and Dave Need Wedding Dates, Hotel Transylvania 3: Summer Vacation and The Lost City. It has also been featured in the television series Telenovela, South Park, No Tomorrow, The Real O'Neals, The Challenge XXX: Dirty 30,  Mary + Jane and The Wilds, and appeared in an Indonesian Mizone commercial in August 2016. The clean version of the song is a playable track in Just Dance 2017. It was also featured in the Brazilian teen soap-opera Malhação during its 24th season.

Censorship

The official clean and radio versions of the song censor the line "go fucking crazy" with "go crazy crazy", with the word "crazy" repeated from the audio. The line "God damn" is replaced with "hot damn". The phrase "fucking delicious" is replaced with "so delicious". In the lyric video, the word "fucking" is listed as "f***ing".

Music channels in the UK owned by Channel Four Television Corporation censor "fucking" by reversing the audio, rather than adopting the official clean version of the song. Jonas' mouth is blurred when he sings the obscenity. MTV channels in the UK replace the line "...Go fucking crazy..." with "...Go for me crazy...", lifting audio from "Walk for me, baby", though no visual editing is imposed in this instance.

Personnel
 Mixer: Serban Ghenea
 Assistant mixer: John Hanes
 Bass, programming, guitar, percussion, background vocalist, producer, Lyricist, composer, drums: Mattias Larsson
 Background vocalist, programming, producer, lyricist, composer, percussion, bass, drums, guitar: Robin Frederiksson
 Background vocalist, lyricist, composer: Justin Tranter
 Lyricist, composer, lead vocalist: Joe Jonas

Charts

Weekly charts

Year-end charts

Certifications

Release history

References

Notes 

2015 debut singles
2015 songs
DNCE songs
Republic Records singles
Song recordings produced by Mattman & Robin
Number-one singles in Poland
Number-one singles in Israel
Media about cakes
Songs written by Joe Jonas
Songs written by Justin Tranter
Songs written by Robin Fredriksson
Songs written by Mattias Larsson
Funk songs
Nu-disco songs